The Mr. and Mrs. Louis P. Butenschoen House is a single-family home located at 1212 Helen Street in Midland, Michigan. It was listed on the National Register of Historic Places in 2004.

History
Louis Butenschoen was a technological chemical engineer at Dow Chemical Company. In 1941, the Butenschoens hired architect Alden B. Dow to design this house. They signed a contract with the Alden Dow Building Company to build it, and construction was completed in the summer of 1942. The Butenschoens lived in the house well into the 21st century.

Description
The Butenschoen House is a single story brick house. It is located on a spacious corner lot on the Midland Country Club, set well back from the road. It has an intersecting hip roof with deep eaves. The front facade has a broad blank garage wall on one end, is balanced by large living room windows on the other. A large central entrance is in between. A walkway runs from the driveway to the front entrance, sited under the protection of the eaves. A large, low concrete planter is located at the end of the walk.

References

		
National Register of Historic Places in Midland County, Michigan
Buildings and structures completed in 1942
Alden B. Dow buildings
Midland, Michigan